Vincent Browne (born 1947) is an Irish sculptor.

Biography 
Browne was born in Dublin in 1947. He studied at the National College of Art and Design and at the Jan Van Eyck Academy in the Netherlands. In 1987, Browne represented Ireland in Budapest at the 7th International Small Sculpture Show. He created a well-loved Dublin landmark, Mr. Screen, the squat bronze usher who stands outside the Screen Cinema at the junction of Hawkins Street and Townsend Street in Dublin. Mr Screen was made from two immersion water heaters. His public commissions also include Anti-War Memorial (Limerick, 1987) and the bronze Palm Tree seat in Temple Bar, Dublin.

In 2005, Browne was commissioned to create a sculpture for the exterior of the Blanchardstown Civic Offices called The Tree of Life.

Notable works 

 Anti-War Memorial, Limerick (1987)
 Mr. Screen (1988)
 Palm Tree
 The Tree of Life (2005)

Gallery

References

1947 births
Living people
Irish sculptors
Aosdána members
Artists from Dublin (city)
Alumni of the National College of Art and Design